WHBF-TV (channel 4) is a television station licensed to Rock Island, Illinois, United States, serving as the CBS affiliate for the Quad Cities area. It is owned by Nexstar Media Group alongside Burlington, Iowa–licensed CW owned-and-operated station KGCW (channel 26); Nexstar also provides certain services to Davenport, Iowa–licensed Fox affiliate KLJB (channel 18) under a shared services agreement (SSA) owner Mission Broadcasting. The stations share studios in the Telco Building on 18th Street in downtown Rock Island, while WHBF-TV's transmitter is located in Bettendorf, Iowa.

History

Early history
WHBF-TV signed on the air on July 1, 1950. It is the fifth-oldest surviving station in Illinois, and the oldest outside Chicago. It was owned by the Potter family, publishers of the Rock Island Argus along with WHBF radio (1270 AM, later known as WKBF, now defunct; and 98.9 FM, now WLKU).

WHBF-TV has been a CBS affiliate since its inception, but carried secondary affiliations with ABC and the DuMont Television Network. After DuMont's demise in 1956, WHBF shared ABC programming with primary NBC affiliate WOC-TV (channel 6, now KWQC-TV) until WQAD-TV (channel 8) signed on as an ABC affiliate in 1963. During the late 1950s, the station was also briefly affiliated with the NTA Film Network.

The Potters broke up their media holdings in 1986; at that time, Citadel Communications acquired WHBF-TV, and the radio stations moved out of the Telco Building. The following year, Lynch Entertainment acquired a stake in the station; at that time Coronet Communications Company was formed as a partnership between Citadel and Lynch.

WHBF-TV was the first station in the area to use color radar and now uses the state-of-the-art weather system known as ESP: Live (Exclusive Storm Prediction). This allows the station to alert the Quad Cities about any potential weather hazards. Citadel's other stations also use the ESP: Live branding. On January 29, 2007, WHBF-TV rebranded as "CBS 4". It also adopted a variation of the circle logo shared with Citadel's other major network affiliates.

Nexstar ownership
On September 16, 2013, Citadel announced that it would sell WHBF-TV, along with WOI-DT in Des Moines and KCAU-TV in Sioux City to the Irving, Texas–based Nexstar Broadcasting Group for $88 million. Nexstar immediately took over the station's operations through a time brokerage agreement. The deal followed Citadel founder and CEO Phil Lombardo's decision to "slow down," as well as a desire by Lynch Entertainment to divest its investments in WHBF and WOI.

Six weeks later, on November 6, Nexstar announced that it would purchase the stations owned by Grant Broadcasting—including Fox affiliate KLJB (channel 18) and CW affiliate KGCW (channel 26)—for $87.5 million. Nexstar was able to acquire KGCW directly as, under FCC regulations in effect at the time, the Davenport–Moline–Rock Island market had eight independent, full-power station owners—the minimum required to permit a duopoly—through the existing KLJB/KGCW combination (even though that duopoly originated through the latter's 1996 conversion into a KLJB satellite). Due to FCC ownership regulations that prohibited ownership of two or more of the four highest-rated television stations in the same media market, KLJB was spun off to Marshall Broadcasting Group, a newly formed minority-controlled company headed by Pluria Marshall Jr.; Nexstar subsequently assumed the operations of KLJB through a shared services agreement, forming a virtual triopoly with WHBF and KGCW. The sale for WHBF was completed on March 13, 2014. The deal reunited WHBF with two of its former Citadel sister stations, ABC affiliates WIVT in Binghamton, New York and WVNY in Burlington, Vermont.

On January 27, 2016, Nexstar announced that it would acquire Richmond, Virginia–based Media General—which had owned NBC affiliate KWQC-TV since November 2013—for $4.6 billion, in exchange for giving right of first refusal to the Meredith Corporation to acquire any broadcast or digital properties that may be divested (a clause that Meredith did not exercise) as compensation for terminating a concurring acquisition agreement with Media General to accept Nexstar's counterbid. Because of the FCC's "top-four" rule in its duopoly regulations, Nexstar was precluded from acquiring KWQC directly and was required to sell either WHBF (possibly in conjunction with the SSA with KLJB) or KWQC to another company. Nexstar was allowed to keep KGCW, either under its existing duopoly with WHBF or through the formation of a new duopoly with KWQC as that station ranked below the top four ratings threshold.

On June 3, 2016, Nexstar announced that it would retain ownership of WHBF and fellow CBS-affiliated sister station WFRV-TV in Green Bay, Wisconsin, and—on Media General's behalf—sell KWQC and its ABC-affiliated sister station in Green Bay, WBAY-TV, to Gray Television for $270 million. The transaction was approved by the FCC on January 11, 2017; the sale was completed on January 17, at which point the existing Nexstar stations and the former Media General outlets that neither group had to sell in order to rectify ownership conflicts in certain markets became part of the renamed Nexstar Media Group.

On December 3, 2018, Nexstar announced it would acquire the assets of Chicago-based Tribune Media—which has owned WQAD-TV since December 2013—for $6.4 billion in cash and debt. Nexstar was precluded from acquiring WQAD directly or indirectly, as FCC regulations prohibit common ownership of more than two stations in the same media market, or two or more of the four highest-rated stations in the market. (Furthermore, any attempt by Nexstar to assume the operations of WQAD through local marketing or shared services agreements would have been subject to regulatory hurdles that could have delayed completion of the FCC and Justice Department's review and approval process for the acquisition.) As such, Nexstar was required to sell either WQAD or both WHBF and KLJB (separately as it would break the grandfathered LMA) to separate, unrelated companies to address the ownership conflict. KGCW could either be retained by Nexstar (tied with either WQAD or WHBF) or sold to the new buyer if WHBF is sold, as KGCW does not rank among the four highest-rated stations in the Quad Cities market.

On March 20, 2019, it was announced that Nexstar would keep WHBF-TV, KGCW and the SSA for KLJB and sell WQAD to McLean, Virginia–based Tegna Inc., as part of the company's sale of nineteen Nexstar- and Tribune-operated stations to Tegna and the E. W. Scripps Company in separate deals worth $1.32 billion; this would make WQAD the first television property in Iowa for Tegna and its first television property in Illinois since the group (under its pre-2016-split structure as the broadcasting arm of the Gannett Company) sold WREX in Rockford, Illinois to the Gilmore Broadcasting Corporation in 1969. The sale was approved by the FCC on September 16 and was completed on September 19, 2019.

Subchannel history
On January 16, 2012, WHBF-TV along with all Citadel stations, launched an affiliation with the Live Well Network on its DT2 subchannel. From December 1, 2008, to January 15, 2012, the station carried the Retro Television Network on DT2. Prior to that, WHBF had been simulcasting its main programming in SDTV on the DT2 subchannel. From March 5, 2011, to January 15, 2012, WHBF-TV's subchannel affiliation with the Retro Television Network had a local competitor in the Quad Cities as the DT2 subchannel of WQAD-TV became an affiliate of Antenna TV after WQAD discontinued their "Quad Cities Weather Channel" service.

Programming
WHBF carries the complete CBS schedule and broadcasts all CBS network programming, as well as syndicated programming, in high definition. Syndicated programming on WHBF-TV includes Inside Edition, Entertainment Tonight, The Good Dish, and Kickin' It with Byron Allen.

During the late 1970s, WHBF-TV was one of the handful of Midwestern CBS affiliates that did not clear The Incredible Hulk, choosing to instead air the country music program Hee Haw, which it carried as part of CBS' own prime time lineup from its 1969 debut until CBS cancelled it during their 1971 rural purge.

From 1982 to 2011, WHBF-TV didn't carry either CBS News Up to the Minute, nor its predecessor, CBS News Nightwatch. Instead the station joined its fellow Citadel stations in signing off every night, making WHBF one of the few stations in the country to still do so.  However, as of the mid-2000s, WHBF ran its transmitters all night, airing a test pattern with station identification superimposed over the pattern.  Digital channel 4.2 has operated 24/7 since the Retro Television Network debut on December 1, 2008. WHBF-TV finally added Up to the Minute to its programming lineup in October 2011. Up to the Minute was replaced by the CBS Overnight News on September 21, 2015.  The move left Iowa Public Television station KQIN as the last Quad Cities television station to sign-off.

News operation

From 1950 to 2011, WHBF, unlike most CBS affiliates, didn't air a morning newscast. Instead, a weather forecast was aired during the CBS Morning News, CBS This Morning, and The Early Show each weekday morning between 6:00 and 9:00 a.m. Previously, WHBF had local news updates during those three shows but later on it was simply a repeat of the weather update that aired earlier in the half-hour. The CBS Morning News was aired at 6:00 a.m. and repeated itself at 6:30 a.m. weekdays on WHBF. Unlike most CBS affiliates, WHBF does not air a midday newscast during the week.

WHBF won numerous awards and public recognition for a ground-breaking news series that ran weekly from April 1995 to April 1996. Robb's Life focused on the life of Robb Dussliere, a Rock Island resident who was battling AIDS. Each week, News Director Ken Gullette (From November 1993 to July 1997) followed Robb as he went to doctors offices, enjoyed his family and worked to renovate a home for HIV and AIDS patients. WHBF viewers watched as Robb went from being relatively healthy in April 1995 to his funeral in April 1996. The stories were unique in that Gullette's voice was never heard and he never appeared on camera. Working as a one-man producer, videographer and editor, he told Robb's story through video, natural sound, interviews and music. The feature stories also ran longer than the normal TV stories. Robb's Life raised awareness, changed viewer opinions about AIDS and won awards from the Illinois and Iowa Associated Press organizations. Most of the weekly features can now be seen on YouTube. Fifteen years after it aired, the Dispatch/Argus ran a story about the impact of the series, and interviewed Robb's parents, Lorney and Hattie Dussliere of East Moline, Illinois.

On December 21, 2010, WHBF-TV became the second in the Quad Cities market, behind KWQC to begin broadcasting its local newscasts in high definition, beginning with the 5:00 p.m. newscast.

During the summer of 2011, WHBF announced morning newscasts would be coming to the station. Meredith Dennis anchored and Travis Michels provided weather information as of September 12, 2011. Also, the 6:00 p.m. news returned after a 14-year absence on September 26, 2011. The local morning newscast, known as CBS4 News This Morning (now known as Local 4 News This Morning), was aired from 5:30 to 7:00 a.m. The CBS Morning News was moved back to 5:00 a.m. and the station's daily paid early morning religious programming was discontinued. As of Spring 2012, CBS4 News This Morning airs from 5:00-7:00 a.m., while the CBS Morning News airs at 4:30 a.m.

In March 2014, Morning Anchor Meredith Dennis left WHBF and was replaced in April 2014 by Emily Scarlett.

On March 4, 2015, WHBF debuted its new set, graphics, and logo. The new Local 4 branding, similar to that of WKRC (Local 12) in Cincinnati, Ohio, WPSD (Local 6) in Paducah, Kentucky, and sister station WOI (Local 5) in Des Moines, went into effect, replacing original CBS 4.

On August 7, 2015, WHBF revealed that a new 4 p.m. newscast would debut in the Fall of 2015. The new broadcast, known as Local 4 News at 4, made its debut on Monday, September 14, 2015. WHBF's new 
4 p.m. newscast directly competes against KWQC's 4 p.m. newscast, which has been on the air since Fall 2011.

On December 31, 2015, it was announced that WHBF would begin producing a one-hour 9 p.m. newscast for its SSA partner station, Fox affiliate KLJB (owned by Marshall Broadcasting Group). Also, on September 5, 2017, it was made public that beginning on September 18, 2017, WHBF would begin producing a new two-hour weekday morning newscast for KLJB from 7 to 9 a.m.

Ratings
WHBF was a solid, if distant, runner-up to rival WOC-TV until the mid-1970s, when it surged to first place. It lost the lead to WOC-TV around 1980. The station was able to hold up the number 2 spot for most of the 1980s until WQAD passed it. Since the late 1980s, WHBF has clearly been the third ranked station in the Quad Cities market. However, during the May 2015 ratings period, the ratings for WHBF did increase after the station's change to the Local 4 branding.

Technical information

Subchannels
The station's digital signal is multiplexed:

Translator

Analog-to-digital conversion
WHBF-TV shut down its analog signal, over VHF channel 4, at 6:01 a.m. on June 12, 2009, the official date in which full-power television stations in the United States transitioned from analog to digital broadcasts under federal mandate. The station's digital signal relocated from its pre-transition UHF channel 58, which was among the high band UHF channels (52-69) that were removed from broadcasting use as a result of the transition, to its analog-era VHF channel 4.  WHBF-TV is now one of the very few TV stations in the United States to broadcast its digital signal on a low VHF channel assignment, alongside former sister station WOI-DT in Des Moines and ABC O&O station WPVI in Philadelphia.

On its second digital subchannel, the station affiliated with the Retro Television Network from December 1, 2008, to January 15, 2012. On January 16, 2012, WHBF, along with all of its sister stations, switched to the Live Well Network, carrying the network in a 16:9 letterbox format while preserving the 480i resolution and 4:3 aspect ratio of the subchannel; scaled down from Live Well Network's 720p master signal. Exactly two years later on January 16, 2014, before Nexstar (which historically dropped all Live Well Network affiliations upon the purchase of acquired stations) took control of WHBF, the station dropped the subchannel entirely. It was the only area station without a subchannel for a period of sixteen months.

In November 2014, while Nexstar was still waiting for the completion of its sale of KLJB to Marshall Broadcasting Group, there was speculation by other local media that KGCW might move to a WHBF subchannel.  On May 14, 2015, Nexstar relaunched WHBF's digital subchannel 4.2 with a standard definition simulcast of KGCW. Due to the fact that KLJB is now owned by a separate company than KGCW, the simulcast of KGCW, which was previously aired on KLJB's 18.2 subchannel, moved to WHBF's 4.2 subchannel as Nexstar owns WHBF and KGCW, where Marshall Broadcasting Group owns KLJB.

Post-transition digital signal issues
During the Summer of 2009 (June 12, 2009), WHBF-TV, being broadcast in digital on a low VHF channel assignment, encountered numerous reception problems and received several reception related complaints in its first two months alone of being broadcast digitally on VHF channel 4. As a result, the station's then-owner (Citadel) filed an application for a digital UHF fill-in translator on channel 47  and also sought permission to increase the ERP output of its main digital signal on VHF channel 4 from 24.1 kW to 33.7 kW.  The fill-in translator is located on the station's Rock Island tower at the telco building-based studios in downtown and operates at an ERP of 2300 watts. Sister station KCAU-TV in Sioux City as well as former sisters WOI-DT in Des Moines and KLKN in Lincoln, Nebraska, all of which returned their digital broadcasts to their former analog channel assignments in the VHF spectrum at the end of the digital transition in 2009 as well, are going through a similar process and they have all set up fill-in translators themselves.

As of September 8, 2009, WHBF has been operating its main digital signal on VHF channel 4 at an effective radiated power of 33.7 kW. Also, as of October 22, 2009, WHBF has been operating its digital fill-in translator on UHF channel 47 from its studio location in downtown Rock Island.

References

External links

The Unofficial Grandpa Happy Website

CBS network affiliates
Court TV affiliates
Grit (TV network) affiliates
Ion Mystery affiliates
Television channels and stations established in 1950
Rock Island, Illinois
Television stations in the Quad Cities
Low-power television stations in the United States
Nexstar Media Group
1950 establishments in Illinois
Companies based in Rock Island County, Illinois